In Roman mythology, Fulgora was the female personification of lightning.  She was the Roman counterpart to Astrape.

External links
 List of Minor Roman Gods

Roman goddesses
Thunder goddesses
Personifications in Roman mythology